The 15th Filipino Academy of Movie Arts and Sciences Awards Night was held 1n 1967 for the Outstanding Achievements for the year 1966. 

Among the many films that was nominated that year, only two films went home victorious after winning almost all of the awards. Ito ang Pilipino of Emar Pictures won 5 FAMAS Awards including the FAMAS Award for Best Picture and Best Actor for Joseph Estrada. The Passionate Strangers on the other hand, won most of the technical Awards including the best director for Eddie Romero.  Apart from these two films, Ibulong Mo sa Hangin was the only film to win a FAMAS for its lead star Amalia Fuentes.

Awards

Major Awards
Winners are listed first and highlighted with boldface.

References

External links
FAMAS Awards 

FAMAS Award
FAMAS
FAMAS